Baizo Kharki, is a village in Pakistan situated in the northeastern strip of Mardan on the edge of Malakand Agency. A road leads to Thana, which is used as an alternate way to Swat, Dir, and Buner. This is the last village in the Union Council of the District Mardan. Ikrampur is protected by large mountains on three sides, but one of the sides open for visitors. Hence they promote, introduce, and expand their trade/business and trouble-free entrance to the Local Market of the village, which is a very beautiful and busy place. It has beautiful mountains, green trees, open fields, and the famous Jewar lake. The main source of irrigation here is the canal system.  The mountains of this village are evergreen. This village is very silent, noise and pollution-free. A typical village consists of cemented paths and carpeted streets with a safe drainage system. Its houses are made from strong stones so the villagers now build their huge houses built with bricks and concrete. Most of the village people live a simple lifestyle.

The favorite location to establish houses is Khana, the pinnacle place for VIPs residents. There are green trees, vast meadows, and flowery bushes everywhere. The blossoming flowers, fragrant air, the rising and setting sun all leave a great influence on the health of villagers. In the summer they rest under the shady and green trees. Women also help the men in their work, along with their household. They also take care of their domestic animals and colorful birds.

Climate 

Pakistan is a predominantly dry country. The flat areas in the south and centre have a desert-like climate. May and June are the hottest months, when it is 40 to 45 °C. The best travel period is from December to March, when it is relatively cool. The north of the country is visited by the monsoon in July and August. In a short space of time a lot of rain can fall and there can be heavy storms. The extreme north is home to the high mountains: K2 and Nanga Parbat are two of the highest mountains in the world.

Geography 

This village had been divided into various Mohallahs (locations). Mountains, hills, plants, trees and green lands play a vital role in the pollution free and much healthy atmosphere of the area. In this regard there are some well-known mountains, like Bhand, Shamshadin, Butan, Neeala and Zarani. There are some renowned springs in the village. One is sited in the premises of Shamshadin and another is situated in the premises of Butan. The water of these springs is fresh, crystal clear and tasty. To provide safety to the various plants and green grass available in these mountains, the Jirga of this village is vigilant over the affairs of these mountains and maintain it well so that the grass can be used for the animals. And various plants and trees can be utilized for alternate purposes. Jirga maintains Nagha System to enhance the fertility of these mountains and when it’s enriched then they dismiss the Nagha for a limited duration.

Mountains of this village are famous for lime-stones, green grass and various trees. There is a good variety of forest animals, dangerous snakes and colourful birds in these mountains. To save the wildlife, hunting is prohibited here.

Transport 

Central Gateway to this stunning place is called Dramona, the main bus stop for short and long route transport to Ikrampur and Palai.

Demographics 

The population of this village is approximately 25,000 people including: utmankhel 70%, Torzai 25%, Dalazak 15%, Baddi 15%,Shalmani 05%, Tawaskhail 05%, Changakhail 5% and miscellaneous 5%.

References

Union councils of Mardan District
Populated places in Mardan District